Trigo Limpio were a Spanish musical trio popular in Spain in the 1970s and 1980s.

The band represented Televisión Española in the sixth edition of the OTI Festival 1977 with the song "" getting the fourth place. Three years later, they represented Spain in the Eurovision Song Contest 1980 with the entry "Quédate esta noche". By the time of their Eurovision participation, Amaya Saizar had been replaced by Patricia Fernández.

Discography 

1976 
1978 
1980 
1981 
1983 
1984 
1995  (1976–1986)

External links 
 Trigo Limpio's songs

Eurovision Song Contest entrants for Spain
Eurovision Song Contest entrants of 1980